Nandigama is a town in NTR district of the Indian state of Andhra Pradesh. It is a Municipality and also the headquarters of Nandigama mandal in Nandigama revenue division.

Geography
Nandigama is located 50 km West of Vijayawada and 46 km east of Kodada.

Climate

Governance 

Civic administration

Nandigama Municipality is the civic administrative body of the town which was constituted in the year 2011. The municipal chairman of Municipality is Padmavathi Yaragorla and the vice-chairman is V.Ashok Kumar.

Politics

Nandigama a part of Nandigama (SC) (Assembly constituency) for Andhra Pradesh Legislative Assembly. It is a reserved constituency for Scheduled Castes. MONDITHOKA JAGAN MOHAN RAO is the present MLA of the constituency from YSR CONGRESS Party. It is also a part of Vijayawada (Lok Sabha constituency) which was won by Kesineni Srinivas of Telugu Desam Party.

Transport 
The Andhra Pradesh State Road Transport Corporation and TSRTC operates several bus buses services from Nandigama bus station to various destinations in Andhra Pradesh and Telangana.

References 

Cities and towns in NTR district
Mandal headquarters in NTR district
Towns in Andhra Pradesh Capital Region